Seoul Metropolitan Fire and Disaster Management Headquarters is a department of the Seoul Metro government in charge of fire and rescue services in Seoul, South Korea.

Fire districts and fire stations 

 Fire districts : 4
 Fire stations : 23
 1st Fire district : Jongno, Jungbu, Yongsan, Eunpyeong, Mapo, Seodaemun
 2nd Fire district : Dongdaemun, Gwangjin, Seongbuk, Dobong, Nowon, Jungnang, Gangbuk
 3rd Fire district : Yeongdeungpo, Gangseo, Yangcheon, Guro, Gwanak, Dongjak
 4th Fire district : Gangnam, Gangdong, Seocho, Songpa

References 
 Seoul Metropolitan Fire and Disaster Management Headquarters

Fire departments
Government of Seoul